Ivan Ivanovych Padalka (Ukrainian: Івaн Івaнович Пaдалка: 15 November 1894, Zhornoklyovy, currently Cherkasy Raion — 13 July 1937, Kiev) was a Ukrainian painter, art professor and author who was shot during the Great Terror.

Biography
He was one of eight children born to a farming family of modest means. He began his education at the local parish school, where he first displayed a talent for art. His abilities were noticed by a local nobleman, who helped him to finance studies at the State Ceramics Vocational School in Myrhorod with Opanas Slastion. His work was often held up as a model for the class. He worked there until 1913, when he was excluded for organizing revolutionary activities.

His earnings enabled him to enroll at the short-lived Kiev Art School. His works were regularly exhibited there, and he began to illustrate children's books.

In 1917, after finishing his studies there, he transferred to the Ukrainian State Academy of Arts, where he became a student in the workshop of Mykhailo Boychuk. While there, he was largely involved in decorative work for buildings, designing posters and creating various revolutionary materials for public display. He also received a commission from the State Publishing House to illustrate a collection of children's stories called Барвінок (Periwinkles). He worked on that project together with Boychuk's younger brother Tymofiy. 

After graduating in 1920, he returned to Myrhorod and became a teacher at his former ceramics school. Later, he taught the same subject at a technical school in Kiev. That year, he returned to Kiev to accept an appointment as a Professor at the State Academy.

In 1936, he was arrested and tortured by the NKVD on charges of counterrevolutionary activities, related to his Ukrainian nationalism. In July, the following year, he was executed by firing squad, together with his former mentor and friend, Boychuk, and the painter Vasily Sedlyar. He was posthomously "rehabilitated" in 1958.

References

External links 

 Detailed biography @ Rodovid
 Марко Роберт Стех «Очима культури» № 37. "The Heritage of Boychukism" @ The Kharkiv Regional Society 
 "The Cock was a Braggart", folk poem with illustrations by Padalka

1894 births
1937 deaths
Ukrainian painters
Ukrainian male painters
Ukrainian ceramists
Executed Ukrainian people